The Election Commission of India held indirect 7th presidential elections of India on 6 August 1977. Even though 37 candidates filed their nominations, 36 of them were rejected, leading to Neelam Sanjiva Reddy being one of the two Presidents of India winning unopposed.

Background
After the death of the sitting president, Fakhruddin Ali Ahmed, on 11 February 1977, the vice-president B. D. Jatti took charge as acting President. An election to the office of President was required to be held within 6 months of the date of the vacancy.

The Electoral College consisted of the members of Lok Sabha (524), Rajya Sabha (232) and 22 state Legislative Assemblies (3776), all together  totalling 4532 electors.

Schedule
The election schedule was announced by the Election Commission of India on 4 July 1977.

References

1977 elections in India
Presidential elections in India
Uncontested elections